Spéléo Club du Liban ("Lebanon's Caving Club") was formed in 1951. It is considered one of the oldest caving associations in the Middle East.

History

In 1940, Lionel Ghorra escorted a French expedition to the Jeita Cave. Ghorra was passionate about the discipline and he led as of 1946 a group of friends who went further into the Jeita cave. Documents about the discipline were gathered, contacts with foreign caving entities were established, and the idea of putting together a collective and organized structure was taking shape. Born in 1951, the Speleo-Club of Lebanon was only officially registered six years later in 1957. The club’s founding fathers were the pioneering cavers Lionel Ghorra, Sami Karkabi, Raymond Khawam, and Albert Anavy. In 1963, Albert Anavy attended the first International Congress of Speleology in Paris and represented the SCL.

The number of enthusiasts increased and the club’s explorations grew in scope and intervention. Many caves were discovered and explored while cavers had started to master vertical techniques by using the first manufactured caving ladders. The deepest sinkhole in the Middle East, Faouar Dara, was soon discovered and fully explored by SCL in 1962.

The importance of the discoveries made in Jeita led to its opening to the public as a tourist show-cave, with Sami Karkabi as its director. Due to SCL’s contribution to the works in Jeita, the club was officially recognized as beneficial to the nation (d’Utilité Publique) in 1963.  Two years later in 1965, the SCL, representing Lebanon, became a founding member of the International Union of Speleology (UIS) at the 4th International Congress of Speleology. At this event, Albert Anavy was also elected as the first General Secretary of the UIS.

Throughout the years, SCL cavers made many discoveries and studies, attempted underground dives, improved equipment by DIY innovations. SCL is regularly asked to train the Lebanese army in cave rescue operations and in single rope technique.  In addition it is also requested to conduct underground studies for various organizations such as governmental bodies, municipalities, and even consultancy firms.

SCL releases periodically Al Ouat’Ouate (the bat in Arabic), the club’s magazine since 1955.  Consistent, with club activities, the Ouat’Ouate covers all aspects of speleology.

The SCL was the initiator of the first National Gathering of Speleology in 1996, and the main organizer of the Middle-East Speleology Symposium MESS in 2001, which was acclaimed internationally. SCL moved also organized MESS2 in 2006, thus committing itself to organize such an event every five years.

Awards and recognition
The club was awarded the 'A Club that is a Benefit to the Public' Order by the Lebanese government in 1963.

Thanks to the public opening of the upper galleries of Jeita, and to the accurate topography which allowed the Office of Hydraulic Resources to dig a 600m long tunnel and puncture the cave at the terminal siphon level, the SCL was decorated with the National Order of the Cedar, with the rank of Knight, by the President of the Republic in 1969.

SCL’s continuous progress and achievements was last officially rewarded by being granted the National order of the Cedar a second time, with the grade of Officer.

Community service
In 2007, authorities called on the Speleo Club du Liban to help control a fire at Deir al-Qamar, praising the spelunkers turned firefighters: “The youth really helped the firemen, who were not able to do all the work themselves.”

References

External links
 Speleo Club du Liban
 

1951 establishments in Lebanon
Organizations established in 1951
Caving organizations
Clubs and societies in Lebanon
Caving in Lebanon